Samuel Livesey (14 October 1873 – 7 November 1936) was a Welsh stage and film actor.

Life
Livesey's father, Thomas, had been a railway engineer before leaving the industry to establish a travelling theatre with his wife Mary.

The two had six children who all grew up working in the theatre. In 1893, after Thomas's death, Mary opened a purpose built theatre, the Prince of Wales in Mexborough. The family performed frequently on the stage and in touring productions.

Sam and his brother Joseph married actresses who were themselves sisters: Sam married Margaret Ann Edwards in 1900 and Joseph married Mary Catherine Edwards in 1905. Sam and Margaret had two children who subsequently followed their profession, the actors Jack and Barry Livesey. But by 1913 both Joseph and Margaret Ann had died. Sam then married Mary Catherine and adopted her son Roger (his nephew) as his own. Roger Livesey also went on to become a highly successful stage and screen actor. The couple had a daughter together in 1915 whom they named Stella.

Film career

Livesey had a successful film career encompassing both the silent and sound eras. He often appeared as authority figures; the cuckolded headmaster in Young Woodley, the dictatorial paterfamilias in Maisie's Marriage and a variety of Police inspectors and military officers. Alfred Hitchcock cast him as the Chief Inspector in the original silent version of Blackmail but in the subsequent sound version, the role went to Harvey Braban.

Livesey also worked with Anthony Asquith on Moscow Nights and  Alexander Korda (appearing in Rembrandt with his stepson Roger, Dark Journey and cameoing in The Private Life of Henry VIII). Roger and Sam had previously appeared together playing father and son in the 1923 silent Maisie's Marriage. Virtually the whole family - Sam, Mary Catherine ('Cassie'), Jack and Barry - appear as the Boyd family in the 1935 film revue Variety directed by Adrian Brunel. One of his final roles was as Mr Tulliver, the owner of the titular Mill on the Floss, with James Mason portraying his son Tom.

Partial filmography

 The Lifeguardsman (1916) - Capt. Salzburg
 One Summer's Day (1917) - Philip Marsden
 Spinner o' Dreams (1918) - Reuben Hundred
 Victory and Peace (1918, unreleased) - Capt. Schiff
 The Sins of Youth (1919)
 A Sinless Sinner (1919) - Sam Stevens
 The Chinese Puzzle (1919) - Paul Markatel
 The Black Spider (1920) - Reggie Cosway
 Burnt Wings (1920) - Joseph Heron
 All the Winners (1920) - Pedro Darondary
 The Marriage Lines (1921) - Martin Muscroft
 Married Love (1923) - Mr. Burrows
 Wait and See (1928) - Gregory Winton
 Zero (1928) - Monty Sterling
 The Forger (1928) - Inspector Rouper
 Blackmail (1929) - The Chief Inspector (silent version) (uncredited)
 Raise the Roof (1930) - Mr. Langford
 Young Woodley (1930) - Doctor Simmons
 One Family (1930) - The Policeman
 Dreyfus (1931) - Labori
 The Girl in the Night (1931) - Ephraim Tucker
 Jealousy (1931) - Inspector Thompson
 Many Waters (1931) - Stanley Rosel
 The Hound of the Baskervilles (1931) - Sir Hugo Baskerville
 Up for the Cup (1931) - John Cartwright
 The Wickham Mystery (1932) - Inspector Cobb
 Mr. Bill the Conqueror (1932) - Dave Lannick
 Insult (1932) - Major Dubois
 The Flag Lieutenant (1932) - Col. McLeod
 The Wonderful Story (1932) - Doctor
 The Private Life of Henry VIII (1933) - The English Executioner
 Commissionaire (1933) - Sergeant George Brown
 Tangled Evidence (1934) - Inspector Drayton
 The Great Defender (1934) - Sir Henry Linguard
 Jew Süss (1934) - Harprecht
 Regal Cavalcade (1935) - Drinker
 Drake of England (1935) - Sir George Sydenham
 Where's George? (1935) - Sir Richard Lancaster
 Turn of the Tide (1935) - Henry Lunn
 Moscow Nights (1935) - Fedor
 Variety (1935) - Charlie Boyd
 Men of Yesterday (1936)
 Calling the Tune (1936) - Bob Gordon
 Rembrandt (1936) - Auctioneer
 The Mill on the Floss (1936) - Mr. Tulliver
 Dark Journey (1937) - Major Schaeffer
 Wings of the Morning (1937) - Angelo (final film role)

References

External links

Sam Livesey at BFI Database

1873 births
1936 deaths
Welsh male film actors
Welsh male silent film actors
People from Flintshire
20th-century British male actors